It's My Life may refer to:

Film and television
 It's My Life (film), a 2020 Indian film
 My Life to Live (UK title: It's My Life), a 1962 film directed by Jean-Luc Godard
 It's My Life (British TV programme), a 2003–2008 youth discussion programme
 It's My Life (South Korean TV series), a 2018–2019 drama series

Literature
 It's My Life (manga), a 2014–2018 Japanese manga series
 It's My Life, a 1980 novel by Robert Leeson

Music

Albums
 It's My Life (album), by Talk Talk, or the title song (see below), 1984
 It's My Life – The Album, by Sash!, or the title song (see below), 1997

Songs
 "It's My Life" (Amy Diamond song), 2009
 "It's My Life" (The Animals song), 1965
 "It's My Life" (Bon Jovi song), 2000
 "It's My Life" (Cezar song), 2013
 "It's My Life" (Dr. Alban song), 1992
 "It's My Life" (Sash! song), 1996
 "It's My Life" (Talk Talk song), 1984; covered by No Doubt (2003)
 "It's My Life"/"Your Heaven", by Yui, 2011
 "It's My Life", by Connie Britton from the TV series Nashville, 2013
 "It's My Life", by DJ BoBo, 1997
 "It's My Life", by the Monkees from Justus, 1996
 "It's My Life", by Tages from Studio, 1967
 "It's My Life", by Wendy O. Williams from WOW, 1984
 "It's My Life (Finally)", by Sean Ensign from Finally, 2006

See also
 This Is My Life (disambiguation)
 My Life (disambiguation)